Menucourt is a commune in the Val-d'Oise department in Île-de-France in northern France.

Population

Education
Schools include:
Preschools: École maternelle des Cornouillers and École maternelle de la Vallée Basset 
Elementary schools: École des Cornouillers, École de la Vallée Basset, and École Louis Bourgeois
One junior high school, Collège la taillette

High school students may attend Lycée Camille Claudel in Vauréal.

See also
Communes of the Val-d'Oise department

References

External links

Official website 
Association of Mayors of the Val d'Oise 

Communes of Val-d'Oise
Cergy-Pontoise